Rachida is a 2002 Algerian drama film directed by Yamina Bachir. It was screened in the Un Certain Regard section at the 2002 Cannes Film Festival. The film was also the first 35mm full length feature directed by an Algerian woman that was released wide-spread.

Plot
Rachida lives and teaches in a popular neighborhood in Algiers. Like most of her countrymen, she thinks the conflict which is bleeding out her country does not affect her, until the day she is confronted by a group of terrorists that includes a former student of hers, Sofiane. The group asks her to plant a bomb in her school. When she refuses, the terrorists shoot her in cold blood. She saves her life miraculously and takes refuge in a nearby village.

Cast
 Ibtissem Djouadi - Rachida
 Bahia Rachedi - Aïcha
 Rachida Messaoui En - Zohra
 Hamid Remas - Hassen
 Zaki Boulenafed - Khaled
 Amel Choukh - La mariée
 Abdelkader Belmokadem - Mokhtar
 Azzedine Bougherra - Tahar
 Amal Ksili - Fatima

References

External links

2002 films
2002 drama films
Algerian drama films
2000s French-language films
2000s Arabic-language films
Films shot in Algeria
Films set in Algiers
Films directed by Yamina Bachir
2002 multilingual films